The 1930 Texas Longhorns football team was an American football team that represented the University of Texas (now known as the University of Texas at Austin) as a member of the Southwest Conference during the 1930 college football season. In their fourth season under head coach Clyde Littlefield, Texas compiled an 8–1–1 record and finished as SWC champion.

Schedule

References

Texas
Texas Longhorns football seasons
Southwest Conference football champion seasons
Texas Longhorns football